Donnie Marsh (born March 21, 1956) is a men's basketball coach. He is the former head coach at Florida International University and Alabama A&M University. He also served as associate head coach under Mike Davis at Texas Southern, while also having assistant coaching stops at South Florida, UAB, Indiana, Virginia Tech and Florida State. In addition, he served as the head coach of The College of New Jersey from 1989 to 1993 Currently, he is an assistant coach at Florida Gulf Coast.

Head coaching record

References

1956 births
Living people
Alabama A&M Bulldogs basketball coaches
American men's basketball coaches
American men's basketball players
College men's basketball head coaches in the United States
Elizabethtown Blue Jays men's basketball coaches
FIU Panthers men's basketball coaches
Florida Gulf Coast Eagles men's basketball coaches
Florida State Seminoles men's basketball coaches
Franklin & Marshall Diplomats men's basketball coaches
Franklin & Marshall Diplomats men's basketball players
Indiana Hoosiers men's basketball coaches
Lancaster Red Roses (CBA) players
South Florida Bulls men's basketball coaches
TCNJ Lions men's basketball coaches
Texas Southern Tigers men's basketball coaches
UAB Blazers men's basketball coaches
Virginia Tech Hokies men's basketball coaches